Derek Robert Hall (born 5 January 1965) is an English former professional footballer. He was born in Ashton-under-Lyne and is currently senior coach at Port Adelaide Lion F.C. in the South Australian Premier League.

Hall began his career as an apprentice with Coventry City, turning professional in October 1982 and making his only league appearance for the Sky Blues later that season. He joined Torquay United on loan in March 1984, earning himself a permanent move on a free transfer at the end of the season.

In July 1985 he moved to Swindon Town, again on a free transfer, but struggled to settle at the County Ground and moved to Southend United on a free the following August. He settled in well at Roots Hall, playing 123 times over the next 3 seasons, scoring 15 goals in the process, before moving to Halifax Town on a free transfer in July 1989. His next move, after 4 goals in 49 games for Halifax, took him to Hereford United, once more on a free transfer, in July 1991. He was appointed captain of the Hereford side and was ever-present in the 1993–94 season, before becoming part of Greg Downs's clearout at Edgar Street, Hall moving to Rochdale for a fee of £10,000 in August 1994. He made only 24 appearances for 'Dale, scoring twice and despite not being a regular had a chant (to the tune of Wonderwall) invented in his honour.

He joined Altrincham on loan in December 1995 and was released by Rochdale at the end of the season, joining non-league Hyde United. He later moved on to Stalybridge Celtic, Curzon Ashton and Woodley Sports, also playing for Buxton and managing them during the 1998–99 season, before rejoining Curzon Ashton in July 2000 as player-coach. He emigrated to Australia in June 2002, but was back as assistant manager of Curzon Ashton by at least November 2005.

Currently Derek is the Senior Coach at Port Adelaide Lion which plays in the South Australian Premier League in Adelaide, Australia, and Coaching Director at the J & L Consulting Football (Soccer) Academy

References

External links

1965 births
Living people
Footballers from Ashton-under-Lyne
English footballers
Coventry City F.C. players
Torquay United F.C. players
Swindon Town F.C. players
Southend United F.C. players
Halifax Town A.F.C. players
Hereford United F.C. players
Rochdale A.F.C. players
Altrincham F.C. players
Hyde United F.C. players
Stalybridge Celtic F.C. players
Curzon Ashton F.C. players
Stockport Sports F.C. players
Buxton F.C. players
English football managers
Buxton F.C. managers
Association football midfielders